Ousmane Oumar Kane holds the Prince Alwaleed Bin Talal Chair on Contemporary Islamic Religion and Society at the Harvard Divinity School and the Department of Near Eastern Languages and Civilization at Harvard University since July 2012.

Biography 

Kane received a Bachelor of Arts in Arabic and a Masters in Islamic Studies from the Institut national des langues et civilisations orientales at the University of the Sorbonne Nouvelle, and an M. Phil and a Ph.D in Political Science and Middle Eastern Studies from the Institut d'Etudes Politiques de Paris. He held the position of assistant professor of political science at Université Gaston Berger de Saint-Louis in  Senegal,   and  visiting positions at the University of London, the University of Kansas, Yale University, and the Institute for Advanced Study Berlin. He   became  associate professor of International and Public Affairs at Columbia University in 2002, and left for Harvard in 2012. Kane is the maternal grandson of Senegalese Islamic scholar, Ibrahim Niass.

Publications 
 Islamic Scholarship in Africa. New Directions and Global Contexts (London: James Currey, 2021)
 Les Sénégalais d'Amérique (Dakar: CERDIS, 2019)

Beyond Timbuktu: An Intellectual History of Muslim West Africa, Harvard University Press, 2016).
The Homeland is the Arena: Religion, Transnationalism and the Integration of Senegalese Migrants in America, New York: Oxford University Press, 2011. .
Muslim Modernity in Postcolonial Nigeria. A Study of the Society of the Removal of Innovation and Reinstatement of Tradition, Leiden and Boston: E.J. Brill, 2003 
Intellectuels  non Europhones. Dakar : Codesria, 2003 
Translated into English as Non-Europhone intellectuals, and also into, Spanish and Arabic)
Al-Makhtutat al-islamiyya fi Sinighal, (Handlist of Islamic Manuscripts in Sénégal), London, Al-Furqan, 1997.Also published in Arabic as ابراهيم نياس في السنغال / Fihris makhṭūṭāt Maktabat al-Shaykh Mūr Mubay Sīsī wa-maktabat al-Ḥājj Mālik Sih wa-Maktabat al-Shaykh Ibrāhīm Niyās fī al-Sinighāl
Islam et islamisme au Sud du Sahara, Paris, Karthala, 1998, (with Jean-Louis Triaud).

He has also written a number of peer-reviewed journal articles.

References

External links 
Official web page at Harvard Divinity School
Official Website at Islamic Studies Program, Harvard 
 Curriculum vitae

Year of birth missing (living people)
Living people
Harvard University faculty
University of Paris alumni
Sciences Po alumni
Columbia University faculty